Rodney Douglas Martin (March 11, 1936 – December 14, 2014) was an American college basketball coach.  He coached at three South Dakota schools: the University of South Dakota, Mount Marty College and Dakota Wesleyan University and is a member of the South Dakota Sports Hall of Fame.

Martin was born in Sparta, Wisconsin and grew up in nearby La Crosse where he played basketball at Logan High School and at the University of Wisconsin-La Crosse.  After spending several years as a high school coach in Wisconsin, he became an assistant at South Dakota (USD) in 1974.  This job prepared him to become the head coach at Mount Marty College for four seasons, before returning to USD as head coach in 1982.  His record was 52–115 over six seasons.  He left USD to begin a long affiliation with Dakota Wesleyan University (DWU).  He was head coach from 1988 to 2005, compiling a record of 251–257 and winning four conference titles.  He also served as athletic director at DWU from 1990 to 1999.

Martin died on December 14, 2014 in La Crosse.

References

External links
South Dakota Sports Hall of Fame profile

1936 births
2014 deaths
People from Sparta, Wisconsin
American men's basketball coaches
Basketball players from Wisconsin
College men's basketball head coaches in the United States
Dakota Wesleyan Tigers athletic directors
Dakota Wesleyan Tigers men's basketball coaches
High school basketball coaches in the United States
Sportspeople from La Crosse, Wisconsin
Logan High School (La Crosse, Wisconsin) alumni
South Dakota Coyotes men's basketball coaches
Wisconsin–La Crosse Eagles men's basketball players
American men's basketball players
Basketball coaches from Wisconsin